The Perry massacre was a racially motivated conflict in Perry, Florida, in December 1922. Whites killed four black men, including Charles Wright, who was lynched by being burned at the stake, and they also destroyed several buildings in the black community of Perry after the murder of Ruby Hendry, a white female schoolteacher.

Background

The body of a young white woman, Annie "Ruby" Hendry, was found with her throat slashed, lying in a pool of blood, at 4:40 p.m. on December 2, 1922, in Perry in Taylor County, Florida. Her face was badly disfigured from having been beaten with a blunt instrument, so it took half an hour to determine her identity. On December 5, the police had linked the murder weapons found at the scene, a double-barrelled shotgun and a bloody razor, to a black man who had been residing in the area and using the name "Charley Wright". He was determined to be an escaped convict from adjacent Dixie County.  Search parties with guns and bloodhounds were everywhere. Each night after the body was found, buildings serving the black community in Perry were burnt down: schoolhouse, lodge, amusement hall, and then the church.

Authorities deputized local citizens and the roads were sealed. On December 6, Cubrit Dixon, a black man coming from Madison County into Taylor County, was stopped and told to put his hands up by armed citizens who had been deputized. Dixon was shot and killed when he did not comply, and witnesses said he had seemed to be reaching for a gun in his back pocket. Examination of his body found only a closed pocketknife in his back pocket.

On December 7, Albert Young, another black man, was arrested in Valdosta, Georgia. Young was an escaped convict from Kindlon, Georgia, and an acquaintance of Wright’s. On December 8, Charley Wright was arrested in Madison County and identified by police as having used the name "Jim Stalworth". Wright was then reported to have confessed to murdering Ruby Hendry and Young was reported to have admitted to having been with Wright. However, it was also reported that Wright said Young had not participated in the murder.

On December 8, 1922, a crowd of 3,000 to 5,000 white men stopped the transportation of the prisoners and took them for a kangaroo court trial. Wright was determined by the mob to be guilty and burned to death. Young was returned to sheriff's custody and taken to the jail in Taylor County. On December 12, when Young was being moved from the jail, he was abducted and shot to death by a smaller mob.

The Madison–Enterprise newspaper reported on December 15, 1922, that a black man in Perry had been "accused of writing 'an improper note' to a white woman. As retribution for these actions, the man was shot to death in his home and his home was burned down on him."

Wright, a 21-year-old escaped convict, and Albert (or Arthur) Young, his alleged accomplice, were arrested and jailed for Hendry's murder.  A mob several thousand strong, made up of local and out-of-state whites, seized the accused from the sheriff, and extracted a "confession" from Wright by torturing him.  Wright claimed to have acted alone. He was subsequently burned at the stake and the crowd collected souvenirs of his body parts and clothing. Following this, two more black men were shot and hanged. Whites burned the town's black school, Masonic lodge, church, amusement hall, and several families' homes.

See also
 1906 Atlanta race riot
 Ocoee massacre
 Rosewood massacre
 Tulsa race massacre
 List of incidents of civil unrest in the United States

Bibliography 
Notes

References 
 
 
  
 

1922 riots
Massacres in 1922
20th-century mass murder in the United States
Massacres in the United States
Crimes in Florida
Riots and civil disorder in Florida
History of racial segregation in the United States
History of racism in Florida
Lynching deaths in Florida
Mass murder in Florida
Mass murder in 1922
Racially motivated violence against African Americans
Taylor County, Florida
White American riots in the United States
1922 in Florida
December 1922 events
Arson in Florida
1922 murders in the United States
Buildings and structures in Taylor County, Florida
African-American history of Florida
Human trophy collecting
Anti-Masonry